Antsu is a village in Antsla Parish, Võru County in southeastern Estonia. As of 2011, its population was 47.

References

Villages in Võru County